Parayan Marannathu is a 2009 Malayalam film by debutante Arun S. Bhaskar starring Biju Menon, Arun, Lakshmi Sharma and Vidhya Mohan.

Plot 
Chandran (Biju Menon) lives in a small village called Kannadipuzha. Chandran's family comprises his wife Rema (Lakshmi Sharma) and daughter Maalu. Chandran has a neighbour Madhavi (Kalaranjini) who washes clothes for a living. She was born in a rich family but her husband and his family rejected her. Her daughter Gauri is a plus-two student.

Manikandan (Arun), a young man in the village, always tries to help Madhavi since Madhavi brought him up after his mother died and he likes Gauri, but Gauri never feels interested in him. Gauri (Vidya) falls in love with Chandran changing her life completely.

Cast 
 Biju Menon as Chandran
 Arun as Manikandan
 Lakshmi Sharma as Rema
 K. P. A. C. Lalitha
 Vidhya Mohan as Gauri
 Harish Siva as Nair
 Kalaranjini
 Suraj Venjaramood
 Lalu Poul
 Usha

References

External links 
 https://web.archive.org/web/20120311033447/http://popcorn.oneindia.in/title/464/parayaan-marannathu.html
 http://www.nowrunning.com/movie/5129/malayalam/parayan-marannathu/index.htm

2009 films
2000s Malayalam-language films